Sir Henry Norton, 2nd Baronet (ca. 1632ca. 1690) was an English politician who sat in the House of Commons  in 1659.

Norton was the son of Sir Gregory Norton, 1st Baronet one of the regicides of King Charles I. He was disinherited by his father for opposing the trial and execution of the King. He succeeded to the baronetcy on the death of his father as his elder brother had predeceased his father.

In 1659, Norton was elected Member of Parliament for Petersfield in the Third Protectorate Parliament. 
 
Norton married Mabella Norton, daughter of Sir Richard Norton, 1st Baronet of Rotherfield.

References

1632 births
1690s deaths
English MPs 1659
Baronets in the Baronetage of England
Place of birth missing